The Horcones River (Spanish, Río Horcones) is a river of Argentina. It is a tributary of the Salado River.

See also
List of rivers of Argentina

References

 Rand McNally, The New International Atlas, 1993.

Rivers of Argentina
Rivers of Santiago del Estero Province